Penthides flavus is a species of beetle in the family Cerambycidae. It was described by Matsushita in 1933. It is known from Taiwan and Japan.

Subspecies
 Penthides flavus flavus Matsushita, 1933
 Penthides flavus multipubens Makihara, 1978

References

Desmiphorini
Beetles described in 1933